
Trzebnica County is a unit of territorial administration and local government (powiat) in Lower Silesian Voivodeship, south-western Poland. It came into being on January 1, 1999, as a result of the Polish local government reforms passed in 1998. Its administrative seat is Trzebnica, and it also contains the towns of Oborniki Śląskie, Żmigród and Prusice.

As of 2019 the total population of the county is 85,092. The most populated towns are Trzebnica with 13,331 inhabitants and Oborniki Śląskie with 9,099 inhabitants.

Neighbouring counties
Trzebnica County is bordered by Rawicz County and Milicz County to the north, Oleśnica County to the east, Wrocław County and the city of Wrocław to the south, Środa Śląska County and Wołów County to the west, and Góra County to the north-west.

Administrative division
The county is subdivided into six gminas (four urban-rural and two rural). These are listed in the following table, in descending order of population.

References

 
Land counties of Lower Silesian Voivodeship